Abdul Hamid bin Omar (25 March 1929 – 1 September 2009) was the first Chief Justice of Malaysia.

Early life 
Abdul Hamid Omar was born on 25 March 1929 in Kuala Perlis, Perlis Indera Kayangan. He obtained his early education at the Sultan Abdul Hamid College in Alor Setar in 1940, which could not be completed as a result of the Second World War. During the war period, he was able to master the Japanese language. When the war ended, he returned to Alor Setar to continue his studies and passed his "Senior Cambridge" examination. Later, he left for London to further his studies at Lincoln's Inn, and graduated as a Barrister-at-Law in England. He was called to the English Bar in November 1955.

Career
He first entered the Malaysian Civil Service as a Magistrate in 1956, and then moved to become Deputy Public Prosecutor of Perak State (1960–1961) and then quickly moved to being State Legal Advisor of Perak (1961–1962). After a few years he was then Chief Registrar of the Federal Court (1967) and soon afterwards a High Court Judge (1968). After becoming Chief Justice of Malaya in 1985, he was involved in the 1988 Malaysian constitutional crisis, chairing the six member tribunal which resulted in the dismissal of the then Lord President Tun Salleh Abas. After taking over as Lord President of the Supreme Court a vote of no confidence was passed against him by the Bar Council. He retired shortly after he became Chief Justice of Malaysia in 1994, when the Lord President post was abolished and renamed. He was also involved with the Malaysian Red Crescent Society and joined the private sector after his retirement from the judiciary where he was chairman of several companies.

Death
In early 2008 he suffered from a debilitating stroke. He died aged 80 on 1 September 2009 from renal failure at the Gleneagles Hospital, Kuala Lumpur.

Honours
He was bestowed several awards, which include the Seri Setia Mahkota (S.S.M.) which carries the title of Tun by His Majesty Seri Paduka Baginda Yang di-Pertuan Agong on 7 June 1989, the  Panglima Setia Mahkota (P.S.M.), the Panglima Mangku Negara (P.M.N.), the D.P.M.P. and the P.M.P. He was conferred the Honorary Degree of Doctor of Laws by the Oklahoma City University, United States in April 1997.

National honours
:
 Commander of the Order of Loyalty to the Crown of Malaysia (PSM) – Tan Sri (1981)
 Commander of the Order of the Defender of the Realm (PMN) – Tan Sri (1986)
 Grand Commander of the Order of Loyalty to the Crown of Malaysia (SSM) – Tun (1989)
:
 Member Grand Companion of the Order of Sultan Mahmud I of Terengganu (SSMT) – Dato’ Seri (1991)
 Knight Grand Commander of the Order of the Crown of Terengganu (SPMT) – Dato’
:
 Grand Knight of the Order of the Crown of Pahang (SIMP) – formerly Dato’, now Dato’ Indera (1985)
:
 Knight Grand Commander of Order of the Crown of Selangor (SPMS) – Dato’ Seri (1991)
:
 Knight Commander of the Order of the Crown of Perlis (DPMP) – Dato’

References

People from Perlis
Malaysian people of Malay descent
Malaysian Muslims
Chief justices of Malaysia
20th-century Malaysian judges
Members of Lincoln's Inn
Commanders of the Order of Loyalty to the Crown of Malaysia
Commanders of the Order of the Defender of the Realm
Grand Commanders of the Order of Loyalty to the Crown of Malaysia
2009 deaths
1929 births